Pachacutec District is one of fourteen districts of the province Ica in Peru.

History 
Samegua District was created by Law 15114 (July 24, 1964).

Authorities

Mayors 
 2011-2014: José Luis Salas Cahua. 
 2007-2010: Angel Adrián Palomino Ramos.

Festivities 
 Rose of Lima
 Our Lady of the Rosary.
 Lord of Luren.

See also 
 Administrative divisions of Peru.

References

External links 
 INEI Peru

1964 establishments in Peru
States and territories established in 1964
Populated places established in 1964